John P. Medbury (died 29 June 1947) was a humorist who wrote for newspapers and film, and did narration for several films. His most notable newspaper contribution was a regular series for the New York Journal called Mutter and Muble. A 1931 edition of the Motion Picture Herald referred to him as noted humorist of Hearst paper fame. He wrote comedic content for the Reservist, a newspaper produced at the San Pedro Naval Reserve Training Camp. 

In 1936 Medbury focused on screen writing, for MGM and Columbia studios at various times. He wrote for the Amos 'n' Andy show. Medbury featured in several of Walter Futter's Travelaughs (Laughing with Medbury) films – short film travelogues where he provided comedic commentary: Laughing with Medbury in Abyssinia, Laughing with Medbury in Africa (1931), Laughing with Medbury in Borneo (1931), Laughing with Medbury in Death Valley (1931), Laughing with Medbury in Mandalay, Laughing with Medbury in Reno (1931), Laughing with Medbury in Turkey (1931), and Laughing with Medbury on Voo Doo Island.

Medbury's first wife, actress Phyllis Eltis Medbury, died in 1936. He died 29 June 1947 at the age of 54 in Laguna Beach, California, of a heart attack. He is buried at Forest Lawn Memorial Park in Glendale, California.

Film Writing Credits
 Reported Missing (1922) – titles
 Hold 'Em Jail (1932) – radio dialogue
 Love in Bloom (1935) – additional dialogue

 Radio Bedtime Stories for Grownups
 "Hot and Bothered"  (1930), story.
 "Never Strike Your Mother", story, with Eddie Buzzell.

References

External links

 
 

1947 deaths
American humorists
American male journalists
1890s births